JPD may refer to:

People 
 John Dwyer (musician), American musician

Police departments
Jackson Police Department (Mississippi)
Juneau Police Department

Other
Joint Planning Document
Judges for Democracy (Jueces para la Democracia)
Joint probability distribution
Journal of Physics D